Pedro Florindo Sassone (12 January 1912 – 31 January 1982) was an Argentinian violinist and composer, leader of his eponymous orchestra, which played tango music, from the 1940s up to the 1970s.

Discography
 A Night in Buenos Aires, Capitol Records (stereophonic) (recorded in Argentina)
 Bien milonguero Vol. 1
 Bien milonguero Vol. 2 
 Dancing tango
 Florindo Sassone Con Sus Cantores: 1947-1950, featuring Angel Roberto Chanel 
 Florindo Sassone y sus cantores 1947/1956 Archivo RCA
 From Argentina to the world 
 Grandes Del Tango 46
 Grandes Tangos Argentinos 
 La última cita 1947-1953, with Jorge Casal, Roberto Chanel
 RCA Club 
 Vol. 08. - Florindo Sassone y su orquesta - Años '47 / '51
 Tangos De Oro Florindo Sassone y sus gran orquesta
 Tango Internacional, recorded in 1971, copyright 1998

External links
 http://www.todotango.com/English/creadores/fsassone.asp 
 http://www.milonga.co.uk/tango/sassone.shtml
 http://www.musicargentina.com/en/cd-tango-dance/florindo-sassone-y-sus-cantores-1947-1956.html 
 https://tango.info/08427328131209
 https://tango.info/0000000059341863

1912 births
1982 deaths
Tango musicians
Argentine violinists
Argentine musicians
20th-century violinists